Robert Friend (November 25, 1913 – January 12, 1998) was an American-born poet and translator. After moving to Israel, he became a professor of English literature at the Hebrew University of Jerusalem.

Biography
Friend was born in 1913 in Brooklyn, New York, to a family of Russian Jewish immigrants. He was the eldest of five children. After studying at Brooklyn College, Harvard and Cambridge, he taught English literature and writing in the U.S., Puerto Rico, Panama, France, England, and Germany. He settled in Israel in 1950, where he lived the rest of his life. He taught English and American Literature at the Hebrew University of Jerusalem for over thirty years. He was well known in Israel as an English-language poet and a  translator of Hebrew poetry.

Robert Friend was gay, and his sexuality found expression in his poetry well before the Stonewall era.  According to Edward Field in the Greenwood Encyclopedia of American Poetry, Shadow on the Sun is "remarkable in that, for its time, it contains so many poems about the author's homosexuality."  Friend's openness continued throughout his writing career.

Literary career
Friend's first published volume of verse was Shadow on the Sun (1941). His last collection of poetry, Dancing with a Tiger: Poems 1941-1998, was published posthumously in 2003. He translated around 800 works from Hebrew, Yiddish, Spanish, French, German, and Arabic. Toby Press published two volumes of his translations in its Hebrew Classics Series: Found in Translation: Modern Hebrew Poets, A Bilingual Edition (2006, Second Revised Edition) and Ra'hel: Flowers of Perhaps (2008, Second Revised Edition). Among the Hebrew poets Friend translated into English are Chaim Nachman Bialik, Rachel, Natan Alterman, Leah Goldberg, Gabriel Preil and Yehuda Amichai.

Awards
Friend won the Jeannette Sewell Davis Prize (Poetry, Chicago).

Poetry
 Dancing with a Tiger: Poems 1941-1998, Edited by Edward Field, Preface by Gabriel Levin (Menard Press, London, 2003)
 After Catullus (The Beth-Shalom Press, Israel, 1997)
 The Next Room (The Menard Press, London, 1995)
 Abbreviations (Etcetera Editions, Israel, 1994)
 Dancing With A Tiger (The Beth-Shalom Press, Israel, 1990)
 Somewhere Lower Down (The Menard Press, London, 1980)
 Selected Poems (Tambimuttu at The Seahorse Press, London, 1976)
 The Practice of Absence (Beth-Shalom Press, Israel, 1971)
 Salt Gifts (The Charioteer Press, Washington, DC, 1964)
 Shadow on the Sun (The Press of James A. Decker, Prairie City, Illinois, 1941)

Translations
 Flowers of Perhaps: Selected Poems of Ra'hel, A Bilingual Edition (The Toby Press, 2008)
 Found in Translation: 20 Hebrew Poets: A Bilingual Edition, Edited and Introduced by Gabriel Levin (The Toby Press, 2006) Found in Translation: 100 Years of Modern Hebrew Poetry, Edited and Introduced by Gabriel Levin, Menard Press, 1999 (Poetry Book Society Recommended Translation)
 S.Y. Agnon: The Book Of The Alphabet (The Jewish Publication Society, Philadelphia, 1998)
 Featured Translator, "Palestinian and Israeli Poets," Modern Poetry in Translation, No. 14, Winter 1998-99, Edited by Daniel Weissbort
 Flowers of Perhaps:  Selected Poems of Ra'hel (Menard Press, London, 1995)
 Featured Translator, "Second International Poets Festival, Jerusalem," Modern Poetry in Translation, No. 4, Winter 1993-94, Edited by Daniel Weissbort
 Leah Goldberg:  Selected Poems (Menard Press, Panjandrum Press, 1976)
 Gabriel Preil:  Sunset Possibilities and Other Poems (The Jewish Publication Society, Philadelphia, 1985)
 Natan Alterman:  Selected Poems (Hakibbutz Hameuchad Publishing House, Israel, 1978)

Seminars
 Poetry reading and discussion. "Three Maverick Poets: An Unflinching Exploration of the Lives and Works of Robert Friend, '34, Chester Kallman, '41, and Harold Norse, '38." Discussion leaders: Edward Field, Edward Mendelson, and Regina Weinrich. Sponsored by Brooklyn College, New York, October 27, 2005.

Periodicals
 Poetry and translations in Poetry, The Washington Post, The New York Times, The New Yorker, Tikkun, Home Planet News, The Jerusalem Post, The Independent, The Atlantic, The Nation, Commentary, The Christian Science Monitor, The New Republic, Partisan Review, Prairie Schooner, Quarterly Review of Literature, Jerusalem Review, Hadassah Magazine, The London Magazine, European Judaism, Forward, Tel Aviv Review, The Beloit Poetry Journal, Ariel, Israel Life and Letters, Neovictorian/Cochlea, Delos, Shirim, Arc 3, 5 A.M., Bay Windows, MidstreamRadio
 Three poems recited by Garrison Keillor in "The Writer's Almanac," January 2003 and January 2004
 "Dreamstreets" program, moderated by Steven Leech, devoted to the poetry of Robert Friend, February 2004 (University of Delaware at Newark)

Musical compositions
 Translation of poem by Natan Alterman in "Mother's Lament", composed by Sharon Farber, performed by the Los Angeles Master Chorale, September 2002
Translation of poem by Ra'hel in "Women of Valor", composed by Andrea Clearfield

References

Further reading
 Greenwood Encyclopedia of American Poetry, Entry written by Edward Field, 2005 
 Chapter about Robert Friend in Edward Field: The Man Who Would Marry Susan Sontag and Other Tales of the Bohemian Era, University of Wisconsin Press, 2005
 "Yaddo Poet Edits Collection by Longtime Mentor and Friend," by Edward Field, Yaddo News, Spring 2004 
 "Epicure of Essence: Robert Friend: 1913-1998" by Gabriel Levin, Introduction to Dancing with A Tiger (NY, Spuyten Duyvil; London, Menard Press, 2003) 
 "Artist's Profile-Robert Friend:  A Life in Poetry" by Edward Field, The Gay and Lesbian Review, May–June 2003
 "Homage to Robert Friend" by Edward Field, Tears in the Fence, Summer 2003 
 Carol Efrati: The Road of Danger, Guilt, and Shame: The Lonely Way of A.E. Housman, Fairleigh Dickinson University Press, 2002
 "Poet's Choice" by Rita Dove, "Book World," Washington Post, July 22 & 29, 2001 
 "Poetic License" by Geoff Graser, Potomac News, April 1, 2000
 "The Calamus Root: A Study of American  Gay Poetry Since World War II" By Walter Holland, Journal of Homosexuality, Vol 34, Issue 3/4, May 9, 1998 
 "Robert Friend, 1913-1998" by Lois Bar Yaakov, The Jerusalem Post,  January 22, 1998 
 "Robert Friend" by Anthony Rudolf, The Independent, January 22, 1998 
 "Poetry of Robert Friend: A Tribute by Gabriel Levin", Tikkun, January/February 1997, Volume 12, no. 1.
 "Friend of Israel" by Reva Sharon, The Jerusalem Post Magazine, May 5, 1995 
 "Robert Friend: Poet of Dual Allegiances" by Ruth Whitman, Modern Poetry in Translation'', New Series #4, Winter 1993-94
 "Interview with Robert Friend" by Karen Alkalay-Gut = * "American Boy: He Went from Campus to CCC to WPA," PM, June 26, 1940

External links
 Robert Friend, poet
 The Drunken Boat: Robert Friend

Copyright
 Robert Friend's copyrights are held by his niece Jean Shapiro Cantu.  His Archives are located at The Brooklyn College Library, Department of Special Collections, and the University of Delaware Library, Department of Special Collections.

1913 births
1998 deaths
Harvard University alumni
Jewish poets
Jewish American writers
Israeli gay writers
American gay writers
American emigrants to Israel
American people of Russian-Jewish descent
Gay Jews
Israeli LGBT poets
Gay poets
American LGBT poets
20th-century American poets
American male poets
20th-century American male writers
Brooklyn College alumni
Israeli translators
Writers from Brooklyn
Academic staff of the Hebrew University of Jerusalem
20th-century translators
20th-century American Jews
20th-century American LGBT people